Broadcast Film Critics Association Awards 2007 may refer to:

 12th Critics' Choice Awards, the twelfth Critics' Choice Awards ceremony that took place in 2007
 13th Critics' Choice Awards, the thirteenth Critics' Choice Awards ceremony that took place in 2008 and which honored the best in film for 2007